Richard Hoeata (born 15 January 1988) is a former New Zealand rugby union player and the founder of Craft Smoothie, a New Zealand-wide smoothie box delivery service.

He played in the lock (and occasionally flanker) position for Taranaki and Tasman. Aged only 21, Hoeata started his career with Taranaki after he was named for their 2009 pre-season campaign. After his 2010 opening season, the impression left on selectors was positive, leading to Hoeata moving south from the North Island to make his provincial debut for Tasman during the 2011 ITM Cup. He earned his first NPC start in Tasman's 9–19 loss over Northland in week one of the competition, he made a further six appearances and crossed the line once. Hoeata returned to play for Taranaki in 2014 and 2015 and was part of the ITM Cup Championship winning squad in 2014.

References

External links
 Craft Smoothie website

1988 births
Living people
New Zealand rugby union players
Rugby union locks
Taranaki rugby union players
Tasman rugby union players
Rugby union players from Tauranga